Mongdin is a village in the Soaw Department of Boulkiemdé Province in central western Burkina Faso. It has a population of 898.

References

Populated places in Boulkiemdé Province